Shirvan National Park — is a national park of Azerbaijan. It was established on July 5, 2003 within the territory of Salyan Rayon  administrative districts.

The Shirvan National Park was established on the base of the Shirvan State Reserve founded in 1969 and neighbouring areas. The reserve‘s activity is focused on the protection and reproduction of the Goitered Gazelle (Gazella sulgutturosa), waterfowl birds and typical plant biotypes of the Shirvan Lowland. The area is 25800 hectares, of which 3500 hectares are water reservoirs. The territory of the park used to be at the bottom of the Caspian Sea and at present it is an accumulative plain, which is 20–25 m below sea level with a slight increase in the relief westwards. In terms of climate the park lies in an area of moderate warm semi-desert and arid steppe. Summers are hot and dry and winters are cool and dry.

Etymology

The word 'Shirvan' appears to be derived from Shīr. The word shir refers to the lion, which is now extinct in the Trans-Caucasus.

Flora and fauna

Flora

In the park there are several types of vegetation. The desert type is represented by Halocnemum, Halostachys and Salicornia formations developed on solonchaks. Halocnemum vegetation occupies about 40% of the territory of the park. The main species is the Halocnemum strobilaceum. The Halostachys phytocenosis has a more complicated structure and a richer species composition than Halocnemum. At the tops of the hills Halostachys grows and the slopes are covered by cereals and motley grass from the ephemeral group.

Salicornia vegetation has developed in a small area of the central part of the park as a result of wet salines and the high level of ground waters. As well as Salicornia europaea, there is also S. rankenive and S. tonkokhstnik.

The semi-desert type of vegetation is represented by formations of sveda and ephemeral wormwood. The latter formation, which occupies 40% of the park area, has the richest species composition. Wormwood dominates, and among ephemera 20-25 species are met, including mast cereals: Poa bulbosa, Bromus, wall barley (Hordeum leporinum), etc.

Meadow-type vegetation is developed in the park on chals (humid lowerings on the relief). The herbage is two-layered and is formed of Alhagi (first layer) and Aeluropus repens (second layer). In some places Artemisia and wall barley (Hordeum leporinum) are found.

Fauna

The fauna is poorly studied. Among amphibians there are variable toad (Bufotes variabilis), tree frogs (Hyla sp.) and marsh frog (Pelophylax ridibundus). Among reptiles there are European pond turtle (Emys orbicularis), Caspian turtle (Mauremys caspica) and spur-thighed tortoise (Testudo graeca), lizard, grass snake (Natrix natrix) Levantine viper (Macrovipera lebetina) and others. The ornitofauna is poorly studied, but according to the existing data there are bustards (Otides), Francolinus, little bustard (Otis tetrax), white-tailed eagle (Haliaeetus albicilla), steppe eagle (Aquila nipalensis), peregrine (Falco peregrinus), saker falcon (Falco cherrug) and Pterocletes orientalis. In winter, there are many migratory birds on the water bodies such as gray goose (Anser anser), mallard duck (Anas platyrhynchus), pintail (Anas acuta) and others.

Among rare mammals species there are red fox, Persian gazelle, wild boar, wolf, jackal, jungle cat, badger, European hare, and others. Greek tortoise, Persian gazelle, Francolinus francolinus, bustard, little bustard, white-tailed eagle, steppe eagle, peregrine, saker falcon are listed in the Red Book. In the past, this area was once within the Asiatic lion's range in the Caucasus, and the Caspian tiger used to visit it from Persia.

The main protected objects are the natural semi-desert complexes of the south-eastern Shirvan, with the world's biggest population of Persian gazelles and the water-wading ecosystem, which is a place of nesting, a migration route and wintering area for many valuable bird species (western part of the Shor-Gel Lake).

Goitered gazelle conservation
Shirvan National Park has played an important role in recovery of Goitered gazelle reintroductions in Azerbaijan and Georgia. Gazelles from Shirvan National Park have been reintroduced to several areas including Vashlovani National Park, Qobustan, Absheron, Ajinohur steppe, Ag-Gel National Park.

See also
 Etymology of the park's name
 Kura River
 Nature of Azerbaijan
 National Parks of Azerbaijan
 Shirvan steppe
 State Reserves of Azerbaijan
 List of protected areas of Azerbaijan

References

External links

 Shirvan National Park Official Website - Ministry of Ecology and Natural Resources of Azerbaijan 
 National Parks: Shirvan National Park - Ministry of Ecology and Natural Resources of Azerbaijan 

IUCN Category II
National parks of Azerbaijan
Protected areas established in 2003
2003 establishments in Azerbaijan